Duplyatsky is a rural locality (a khutor) and the administrative center of Duplaytskoye Rural Settlement, Novonikolayevsky District, Volgograd Oblast, Russia. The population was 922 as of 2010. There are 14 streets.

Geography 
Duplyatsky is located in steppe, on the Khopyorsko-Buzulukskaya Plain, on the Kasarka River, 16 km north of Novonikolayevsky (the district's administrative centre) by road. Orlovsky is the nearest rural locality.

References 

Rural localities in Novonikolayevsky District